Beomil Station is a railroad stations in Busan, South Korea.

 Beomil station (Korail)
 Beomil station (Busan Metro)